This page lists nationwide public opinion polls that have been conducted relating to the 2016 United States presidential election in Florida, contested by Hillary Clinton (Democratic Party), Donald Trump (Republican Party), Gary Johnson (Libertarian Party) and Jill Stein (Green Party). The state was won by Donald Trump with 49.02% of the vote against 47.82% for Hillary Clinton.

September–November 

Three-way race

Four-way race

January–August 2016 

Three-way race

Four-way race

2013–2015 

Three-way race

See also
General election polling
Nationwide opinion polling for the 2016 United States presidential election
Nationwide opinion polling for the 2016 United States presidential election by demographic
Statewide opinion polling for the 2016 United States presidential election
January–August 2016 statewide opinion polling for the 2016 United States presidential election
Pre-2016 statewide opinion polling for the 2016 United States presidential election
International opinion polling for the 2016 United States presidential election

Democratic primary polling
Nationwide opinion polling for the 2016 Democratic Party presidential primaries
Statewide opinion polling for the 2016 Democratic Party presidential primaries

Republican primary polling
Nationwide opinion polling for the 2016 Republican Party presidential primaries
Statewide opinion polling for the 2016 Republican Party presidential primaries

References 

Opinion polling for the 2016 United States presidential election